High Time or High Times may refer to:

Arts, entertainment, and media

Music

Albums
 High Time (MC5 album), a 1971 album by MC5
 High Time (TMGE album), a 1996 album by Thee Michelle Gun Elephant
High Time, a 2010 album by Excalion
 High Times (EP), an EP by Washed Out
 High Times (Dottie West album), 1982
 High Times (Young Dro album), 2013
 High Times: Singles 1992–2006, an album by Jamiroquai

Songs
 "High Time" (song), a 1983 song by Styx
 "High Time", a song by the Grateful Dead from the album Workingman's Dead
 "High Time" a 2016 song by Kacey Musgraves, from her album, Pageant Material
 "High Time (You Quit Your Lowdown Ways)", a song by Waylon Jennings from Dreaming My Dreams
 "High Times" (song), a 1997 song by Jamiroquai
 "High Times", a song by Elliott Smith from the album New Moon
 "It's High Time", a 1982 song from Young Dro's 2013 album, High Times

Other uses in arts, entertainment, and media
 High Time (film), a 1960 film directed by Blake Edwards
 High Times (TV series), a Scottish comedy drama series
 High Times, a book about Uschi Obermaier
 High Times, a cannabis subculture magazine

Other uses
 High Time (horse), a chestnut Thoroughbred